Marinosphaera is a genus of fungi in the family Phyllachoraceae. This is a monotypic genus, containing the single species Marinosphaera mangrovei.

References

External links
Index Fungorum

Phyllachorales
Monotypic Sordariomycetes genera